Another Way may refer to:

 Another Way (album), a 2003 album by Teenage Bottlerocket
 Another Way (1982 film), a Hungarian film
 Another Way (2015 film), a South Korean film
 "Another Way" (Tevin Campbell song), a 1999 song by Tevin Campbell
 "Another Way" (Gigi D'Agostino song), a 1999 song by Gigi D'Agostino
 "Another Way" (Adventure Time), an episode from the third season of Adventure Time